St Michael and All Angels Church stands on Warhill overlooking the village of Mottram in Longdendale, Greater Manchester, England.  The church is recorded in the National Heritage List for England as a designated Grade II* listed building.  It is an active Anglican parish church in the diocese of Chester, the archdeaconry of Macclesfield and the deanery of Mottram.

History

The earliest evidence of a church on the site is in 1225 when clergy attached to the church were witnesses to local documents.  There is a further reference to the church in a taxation document dated 1291.  The present church dates from the end of the 15th century.  A major restoration took place in 1854–55 by E. H. Shellard, during which the nave roof was raised.

Architecture

Exterior

The church is built from local stone quarried from Tinsell-Norr in Perpendicular style.  The plan consists of a west tower, a five-bay nave with a clerestory, north and south aisles, a two-bay chancel and a south porch.  At the east end of each aisle is a chapel.  The north chapel is known as the Hollingworth Chapel and the south chapel is the Staley Chapel.  The tower is in four stages with angled buttresses, a three-light west window above which is a clock face and two-light belfry openings.  In one corner is a stair turret. At the top is a castellated parapet with crocketed corner finials.

Interior
The oldest item in the church is the barrel-shaped Norman font.  Above the chancel arch are painted panels containing the Ten Commandments, the Lord's Prayer and Creed, together with a painting of Moses and Aaron.  The alabaster pulpit of 1885 is by Harry Hems.  The brass chandelier is dated 1755.  The stained glass windows include one by Kempe.

The Hollingworth Chapel is now used as a choir vestry and meeting room, the organ having been replaced by an electronic instrument in 1998. In the chapel is a white marble monument to Reginald Bretland who died in 1703. The Staveley Chapel contains two sandstone effigies which are thought to be those of Sir Ralph Staveley (or Staveleigh) and his wife dating from the early 15th century.  There is a ring of eight bells which were cast in 1910 by John Taylor and Company.  The parish registers date from 1559 for marriages and burials and from 1562 for baptisms.

External features

In the churchyard is a sundial with a dial dated 1811. It consists of a stone shaft with a copper dial and a gnomon.  It is listed at Grade II.  Also listed at Grade II are the gatepiers, railings, steps and walls of the churchyard.  Near the church is a medieval cross which was restored in 1760 and again in 1897, the latter restoration being to celebrate the diamond jubilee of Queen Victoria.  The octagonal shaft stands on a stepped circular ashlar plinth.  On its top is a cubical sundial with three copper faces.  It is listed at Grade II*.

See also

Grade II* listed buildings in Greater Manchester
Listed buildings in Longdendale
List of works by E. H. Shellard

Gallery

References

Church of England church buildings in Greater Manchester
Grade II* listed churches in Greater Manchester
English Gothic architecture in Greater Manchester
Diocese of Chester
Buildings and structures in Tameside